The first-seeded Louie Bickerton and Daphne Akhurst Cozens defeated the unseeded Nell Lloyd and Gwen Utz 6–0, 6–4 in the final, to win the women's doubles tennis title at the 1931 Australian Championships.

Seeds

  Louie Bickerton /  Daphne Akhurst Cozens (champions)
  Marjorie Cox /  Sylvia Harper (semifinals)
  Mall Molesworth /  Emily Hood Westacott (semifinals)
  Dorothy Dingle /  Ula Valkenburg (quarterfinals)

Draw

Finals

Earlier rounds

Section 1

Section 2

Notes

References

External links
  Source for seedings

1931 in Australian tennis
1931 in women's tennis
1931 in Australian women's sport
Women's Doubles